is a Japanese politician from the Liberal Democratic Party. He has represented Saitama 1st district in the House of Representatives since 2012.

In the Second Kishida Cabinet, he serves as Special Adviser to the Prime Minister for Domestic Economic and other special issues.

References 

Living people
1980 births
Members of the House of Representatives (Japan)
21st-century Japanese politicians
Government ministers of Japan
Liberal Democratic Party (Japan) politicians
20th-century Japanese people